The Taini Jamison Trophy is an international netball tournament hosted in New Zealand by the Netball New Zealand organisation. The trophy is contested by the New Zealand national team and at least one touring national team each year. Consequently the format for the competition can vary on a yearly basis.

History
The Taini Jamison Trophy was introduced in 2008 to mark instances when any netballing nation, other than Australia, plays the Silver Ferns on New Zealand soil. When New Zealand and Australia meet in non-World Cup or Commonwealth Games fixtures, the two nations play-off for the Constellation Cup. Since the inaugural series in 2008, most of the leading nations outside Australia have competed for the Taini Jamison Trophy, including England, Jamaica, South Africa, Malawi, Fiji and Samoa. Notably in 2018, after Jamaica won for the first time in the series, Netball New Zealand refused to allow the Jamaicans to travel home with the actual trophy, stating that "for insurance purposes and its ongoing value in the history of New Zealand, we can't really have it go offshore". The trophy was not contested in 2012.

The trophy is named in honour of Taini Jamison, who is one of the most successful Silver Ferns coaches in history with a 90 per cent winning record. As coach of New Zealand from 1967-1971, Jamison was the first woman to coach a New Zealand team to victory in a Netball World Cup, specifically in 1967. The trophy features a hammerhead shark pattern around the top and base of the trophy, with Taini Jamison’s Rotorua Netball Maori motif.

Results

1 The World 7 featured a selection of Jamaica, England, Australia and Samoa internationals coached by Julie Fitzgerald.
2 New Zealand retained the trophy on account of their superior goal difference.

References

External links
 Full list of New Zealand results since 1938

 
New Zealand national netball team series
New Zealand sports trophies and awards
International netball competitions
International netball competitions hosted by New Zealand